Seaton Park railway station is located on the Grange line. Situated in the western Adelaide suburb of Seaton, it is 10.3 kilometres from Adelaide station.

History 

It is unclear when this station was opened.

The railway line between Woodville and Grange opened in September 1882 as a private railway, constructed by the Grange Railway and Investment Company. Seaton Park is a single platform station on a single track branch line.

The shelter at the station was replaced in 2018.

Services by platform

References

External links

Railway stations in Adelaide